Iton is a river in Normandy, France.

Iton may also refer to:

Iton (skipper), genus of grass skipper butterflies
Iton 77 Israeli monthly literature and culture magazine
Richard Iton, American  professor of African American studies 
Iton (Thessaly), town of ancient Thessaly, Greece
Iton (Eton) a clan of Beti-Pahuin peoples